Freya Adams is an American actress, best known for her appearance in the film Advantageous.

Early life
Adams was raised in Wheaton, Illinois.

Career
Adams's first starring role was in the movie Making Revolution. After this, she had a cameo role in the Bollywood movie Kal Ho Naa Ho.

She's consistently starred in supporting roles in television series, most notably for The Blacklist and New Amsterdam, short films and independent movies. Her most notable performance is in the independent drama movie Advantageous.

Filmography

References

External links
 

Actresses from Illinois
American film actresses
American television actresses
People from Wheaton, Illinois
Living people
21st-century American actresses
Year of birth missing (living people)